Recoil Glacier is a tributary glacier descending from the Deep Freeze Range, south of Mount Pollock, to the Campbell Glacier, in Victoria Land. Named by the northern party of New Zealand Geological Survey Antarctic Expedition (NZGSAE), 1962–63, because the geologist was said to have "recoiled in disgust" on finding little of geological interest there and not what he expected.
 

Glaciers of Victoria Land
Scott Coast